The 1944 United States presidential election in New Jersey took place on November 7, 1944. All contemporary 48 states were part of the 1944 United States presidential election. Voters chose 16 electors to the Electoral College, which selected the president and vice president.

New Jersey was won by the Democratic nominees, incumbent President Franklin D. Roosevelt of New York and his running mate Senator Harry S. Truman of Missouri. Roosevelt and Truman defeated the Republican nominees, Governor Thomas E. Dewey of New York and his running mate Governor John W. Bricker of Ohio.

Roosevelt narrowly carried New Jersey with 50.31% of the vote to Dewey's 48.95%, a margin of 1.35%. Reflecting the closeness of the statewide result, Roosevelt and Dewey virtually split the state's 21 counties: Roosevelt won 10 counties to Dewey's 11. Despite winning 1 less county, Roosevelt edged out Dewey statewide with decisive victories in some of the most heavily populated parts of the state, while keeping the results close in heavily populated counties that he lost.

In North Jersey, Roosevelt maintained his dominance in heavily populated Hudson County, part of the New York City metro area where the New Deal Coalition was very strong, breaking 60% of the vote in the county for the fourth election in a row. Roosevelt also won heavily populated Middlesex County, Mercer County, and Passaic County, although Dewey won majorities in Bergen County, Union County, and Morris County. Dewey also narrowly won Essex County with a plurality.

Roosevelt performed much more strongly overall in South Jersey, winning majorities in 6 out of 7 of the southernmost counties in the state; his strongest county win there was urban Camden County, where he broke 60% of the vote. In South Jersey, Dewey won only rural Cape May County. Besides his victories in North Jersey, Dewey also won Monmouth County and Ocean County in the central portion of the state.

New Jersey in this era was usually a swing state with a Republican lean, and its results in 1944 adhered to that pattern. Roosevelt had carried the state in the midst of all three of his preceding nationwide victories, but with the exception of his 1936 landslide, always by very narrow margins. As Roosevelt decisively won re-election to an unprecedented fourth term, carrying 36 out of 48 states, New Jersey was his second-narrowest victory in the nation. FDR's close 1.35% margin of victory in New Jersey made the state about 6% more Republican than the national average. Roosevelt was the first Democrat ever to win the presidency without Warren County.

Results

Results by county

See also
 Presidency of Franklin D. Roosevelt
 Presidency of Harry S. Truman
 United States presidential elections in New Jersey

References

New Jersey
1944
1944 New Jersey elections